This is a list of notable Italian Americans.

Anarchists
Luigi Galleani (1861–1931)
Arturo Giovannitti (1884–1959) - union leader and poet
Nicola Sacco (1891–1927)
 Bartolomeo Vanzetti (1888–1927)
Carlo Tresca (1879–1943)

Architects
Vito Acconci
Pietro Belluschi
Giorgio Cavaglieri
Mario J. Ciampi
Neil Denari
Romaldo Giurgola
Michael Manfredi
Rosaria Piomelli
 George Ranalli
Mario Salvadori
Lawrence Scarpa
Ricardo Scofidio
Paolo Soleri
Robert Venturi

Artists

Comic artists, cartoonists, illustrators
Brian Azzarello - comic book writer
Joseph Barbera (1911–2006) - animator, cartoon artist, storyboard artist, director, producer, and co-founder, together with William Hanna, of Hanna-Barbera
Timothy D. Bellavia (born 1971) - children's illustrator, author and founder of the We Are All The Same Inside - Sage doll-making workshop
Ivan Brunetti (born 1967) - cartoonist and comics author
John Buscema (1927–2002) - comic-book artist and one of the mainstays of Marvel Comics during its 1960s and 1970s ascendancy into an industry leader and its subsequent expansion to a major pop culture conglomerate
Greg Capullo (born 1962) - comic book artist
Anthony Flamini (born 1978) - comic book writer
Frank Frazetta (1928–2010) - one of the world's most influential fantasy and science fiction artists
Dick Giordano (1932–2010) - comic book artist and editor
Frank Giacoia (1925–1989) - comic book artist
Carmine Infantino (1925–2013) - comic book artist and editor who was a major force in the Silver Age of Comic Books
Walter Lantz (1900–1994) - cartoonist and animator, founded the Walter Lantz Studio, created Woody Woodpecker
Bob Montana (1920–1975) - comic strip artist who created the characters that launched Archie comics
Joe Orlando (1927–1998) - illustrator, writer, editor and cartoonist
Jimmy Palmiotti - writer and artist of various comics, games and film
Leo Politi (1908–1996) - artist and author who wrote and illustrated some 20 children's books
 Don Rico (1912–1985) - comic book writer-artist, paperback novelist, screenwriter and wood engraver; co-created the Marvel Comics character Black Widow with Stan Lee
John Romita, Sr. (born 1930) - comic book artist known for his work on Marvel Comics' The Amazing Spider-Man
Don Rosa (born 1951) - comic book artist for Disney comics
Eric Stefani (born 1967) - pop musician, former Simpsons animator, and Grammy-nominated composer and writer
Jim Valentino (born 1952) - writer, penciler and editor of comic books
Gerard Way (born 1977) - comic book writer; frontman of the American rock band My Chemical Romance

Digital artists and illustrators
Ashley Biden (born 1981) - founder of the fashion company Livelihood, daughter of Joe and Jill Biden
Louise Fili (born 1951) - graphic designer, 2014 American Institute of Graphic Arts Medalist
Fred Marcellino (1939–2001) - illustrator

Painters
John Balossi (1931–2007) - painter and sculptor
Alfred D. Crimi (1900–1994) - muralist and painter
Ettore (Ted) DeGrazia (1909–1982) - painter, best known for American Southwest subjects
Robert De Niro, Sr. (1922–1993) - abstract expressionist, father of actor Robert De Niro, Jr.
Sheila Giolitti (born 1957) - painter and art dealer
Robert Longo
Carla Carli Mazzucato (born 1935) - modern expressionist painter
Tony Sisti (1901–1983) - painter and boxer
Frank Stella (born 1936) - painter and printmaker
Joseph Stella (1877–1946) - futurist painter known for his depictions of industrial America

Photographers
Lynsey Addario (born 1973) - photojournalist known for her coverage of women in war-torn countries
Severo Antonelli (1907–1995) - legendary figure in Philadelphia Italian American history and the subject of one of the largest ever one-man shows at the Smithsonian Institution
Franco A. "Frank" Barsotti (1937–2012) - photographer and professor emeritus from the School of the Art Institute of Chicago
Justin Guariglia (born 1974) - photographer and contributing editor to National Geographic Traveler, and a regular contributor to Smithsonian Magazine
Isa Leshko (born 1971) - artist/photographer and author of Allowed to Grow Old: Portraits of Elderly Animals from Farm Sanctuaries published by the University of Chicago Press in 2019
Luis Marden (1913–2003) - photographer, explorer, writer, filmmaker, diver, navigator, and linguist who worked for National Geographic magazine
Nick Saglimbeni - 3D photographer
Francesco Scavullo (1921–2004) - fashion photographer known for his work on the covers of Cosmopolitan magazine and his celebrity portraits
Mario Sorrenti (born 1971) - fashion photographer

Sculptors
Vincent Cavallaro
Jasper D'Ambrosi
John DeAndrea
Joe De Santis
Arturo Di Modica
Mark Di Suvero
Virginio Ferrari
Thomas Gaetano LoMedico 
Costantino Nivola
Corrado Parducci
Piccirilli Brothers
Italo Scanga - neo-Dadaist

Business

Criminals

Salvatore Briguglio - former mobster, one of the prime suspects in the disappearance of Jimmy Hoffa
Al Capone, "Scarface" - famous mobster
Michael Franzese - former mobster
Santino William Legan - perpetrator of the Gilroy Garlic festival shooting

Entertainers

Actors

Food
Mario Batali- chef
Joe Bastianich - chef and television personality 
Lidia Bastianich - chef and television personality 
Hector Boyardee - famous for his Chef Boyardee brand of food products
Caesar Cardini - creator of the Caesar salad
Michael Chiarello - celebrity chef specializing in Italian-influenced California cuisine
Tom Colicchio - chef, restauranteur, political activist, and head judge on Bravo's Emmy Award winning Top Chef
Giada De Laurentiis - host of the Food Network program Everyday Italian
Dom DeLuise - actor and celebrity chef who wrote several cookbooks and videos on his family's Italian-influenced cuisine
Guy Fieri - chef and host of the Food Network program "Diners, Drive-Ins and Dives"
Gina Keatley - chef and television personality; influenced charities in New York City 
 Sirio Maccioni - restaurateur and author
Rachael Ray - Food Network chef and Emmy-winning television personality
Nick Stellino - chef and television personality 
Carlo Vaccarezza - restaurateur
Buddy Valastro - chef

Inventors
Anthony Adducci (1937–2006) - pioneer of the medical device industry in Minnesota; best known for founding Guidant Corp. precursor Cardiac Pacemakers, inc., now part of Boston Scientific, the company that manufactured the world's first lithium battery-powered artificial pacemaker
Giuseppe Mario Bellanca - designer of the first monoplane in the United States with an enclosed cabin
Enea Bossi
Lorenzo Del Riccio - inventor of fotofinish camera
Daniel DiLorenzo - medical device entrepreneur and physician-scientist. He is the inventor of several technologies for the treatment of neurological disease
Federico Faggin (born 1941) - physicist, engineer, inventor and entrepreneur; best known for designing the first commercial microprocessor, the Intel 4004
Gerard J. Foschini
The Jacuzzi family - developed the deep well water pump that led to the famous whirlpool bath
Antonio Meucci (1808–1889) - credited by the Congress of the United States with the invention of the telephone
Antonio Pasin (1897–1990) - inventor of the Radio Flyer stamped steel toy wagoni
Sam Porcello (1935–2012) - food scientist who worked at Nabisco on the modern Oreo cookie in particular, was the inventor of the white Oreo cookie creme-filling. His work earned him the nickname, "Mr. Oreo."
Lorenzo Ponza - inventor of the modern baseball pitching machine
Francis Rogallo - engineer at NASA, designed the Rogallo wing, which found its greatest success in hang gliders and kites
 Andrea Rossi (born 1950) - entrepreneur who claims to have invented the cold fusion device E-Cat
Andrew Toti
Andrew Viterbi (born 1935) - engineer, billionaire, cofounder of Qualcomm, inventor of the Viterbi algorithm
Frank Zamboni - inventor of the modern ice resurfacer

Jurists

Law enforcement figures
Joseph Arpaio (born 1932 in Springfield, Massachusetts) - law enforcement officer, most notably as the Sheriff of Maricopa County, Arizona; the child of immigrants from Lacedonia
Michael D'Andrea - officer of the Central Intelligence Agency, appointed to head the Agency's Iran Mission Center
Pete DeFazio
Cate Edwards - daughter of former United States Senator John Edwards and Elizabeth Edwards
Gil Garcetti (born 1941) - Los Angeles County's 40th district attorney 
Joseph D. Pistone - undercover FBI agent who went undercover as Donnie Brasco and infiltrated the Bonanno crime family
Louis Freeh (born 1950 in Jersey City, New Jersey) - Director of the U.S. Federal Bureau of Investigation (FBI) 1993–2001
Rudolph Giuliani - early career was a US attorney in S.D.N.Y., prosecuting high-profile cases, including Cosa Nostra cases
Dan Mitrione - Italian-born American police officer and U. S. government advisor in Latin America
Frank Rizzo
Frank Serpico
Joe Petrosino - NYCPD lieutenant in charge of the Italian Squad, an elite corps of Italian-American detectives formed to fight the Mafia
Charles Joseph Bonaparte - member of Theodore Roosevelt's Cabinet and founder of the Federal Bureau of Investigation (FBI)

Journalism (print and multimedia)

 
Melissa Anelli - resident of Staten Island, journalist at Staten Island Advance and webmaster of The Leaky Cauldron
Carlo Barsotti - emigrated from Italy to New York City in 1872. In 1879, he founded the Il Progresso Italo-Americano newspaper in New York City
Maria Bartiromo - financial journalist and television host
Joe Benigno - WFAN sports radio personality
David Brancaccio - journalist
Harry Caray (1914–1998) - born Harry Christopher Carabina, sports broadcaster, did play-by-play for the St. Louis Cardinals, Chicago White Sox, and most famously the Chicago Cubs; Cubs win! Cubs win!
Tucker Carlson - television host and conservative political commentator 
Matt Casamassina - video game journalist working for IGN
Danny Casolaro - freelance journalist
Igor Cassini - journalist
Chris Cimino - co-host of Today in New York on WNBC, the NBC affiliate in New York City
Kellyanne Conway - president and CEO of The Polling Company Inc./Woman Trend, and has been a political commentator on CNN, Fox News, and Fox Business
Anthony Cumia - "Anthony" of the Opie and Anthony show
Rick Francona - NBC military analyst
Michael Gargiulo - co-host of Today in New York on WNBC, the NBC affiliate in New York City
John Iadarola - progressive political commentator for The Young Turks
Megyn Kelly - Fox News Channel political commentator and former corporate defense attorney
Charlotte Laws - author, columnist, political commentator, former politician, animal rights advocate, anti-revenge porn activist (known as the "Erin Brockovich of revenge porn")
Anthony Fantano - music critic and founder of The Needle Drop, a music related video blog
Al Giordano - political commentator, and former anti-nuclear and environmental activist
Steve Lopez - journalist; a columnist for the Los Angeles Times since 2001; the son of Spanish and Italian immigrants
Rob Marciano - journalist and meteorologist
Ann Nocenti - journalist, writer and editor, known for her work on comic books and magazines
Alexandra Pelosi - journalist, documentary filmmaker, and writer; daughter of Nancy Pelosi and Paul Pelosi
Dana Perino - political commentator and author who served as the 26th White House Press Secretary, serving under President George W. Bush
Generoso Pope Jr. (1927–1988) - founder of the National Enquirer
Tony Rizzo - sports anchor with WJW-TV, the Fox affiliate in Cleveland
Allison Rosati - WMAQ-TV nightly anchor, maternal Italian ancestry
Rick Santelli (born 1956) - editor for the CNBC Business News network
Lauren Scala - co-host of Today in New York on WNBC, the NBC affiliate in New York City
Elaine Sciolino - Paris bureau chief of The New York Times
Karley Sciortino - writer, television host, and producer
Carla Sinclair - editor-in-chief at Craft magazine for O'Reilly Media

Military

Sgt. John Basilone - USMC, Medal of Honor recipient of World War II
Major John Belli - Quartermaster General of the U.S. Army 1792–1794
Corporal Anthony Casamento - USMC, Medal of Honor recipient of World War II
Lieutenant General Peter W. Chiarelli
 Lieutenant General Joseph P. DiSalvo - Military Deputy Commander of United States Southern Command
 General Curtis Scaparrotti, Commander of United States European Command
Col. Luigi Palma di Cesnola - Civil War Union Cavalry officer, and Medal of Honor recipient
Lt Col Rick Francona - U S Air Force officer
Major Don Gentile (Dominic Salvatore Gentile) (1920–1951) - US Air Force officer
Edmund P. Giambastiani - Vice Chairman of the Joint Chiefs of Staff
Giovanni Martini - trumpeter; only member of Custer's army to leave the site of the Battle of the Little Big Horn alive
General Raymond T. Odierno - incumbent Chief of Staff of the United States Army
Peter Pace - USMC, Chairman of the Joint Chiefs of Staff
Antonio Pierro - lived to be one of the oldest surviving veterans of World War I
Joseph L. Romano
Vito Trause - World War II prisoner of war
 Walter Schirra - naval officer and aviator, aeronautical engineer, test pilot, and one of the original seven astronauts chosen for Project Mercury
Maj. Gen. Francis D. Vavala - Adjutant General, Delaware Army National Guard
Humbert Roque Versace - United States Army officer and POW in Vietnam
Gen. Anthony Zinni - USMC, former Commander in Chief of U.S. Central Command (CENTCOM)

Politicians

Founding Fathers of the United States
William Paca - signer of the Declaration of Independence, and President of Maryland
Caesar Rodney - signer of the Declaration of Independence, and President of Delaware

Members of Congress
Mark Amodei - American lawyer and politician serving as the U.S. representative for Nevada's 2nd congressional district
John Barrasso - American physician and politician serving as the senior United States senator from Wyoming (2007–present)
David Cicilline - American lawyer and politician serving as the U.S. representative for Rhode Island's 1st congressional district since 2011
Catherine Cortez Masto - American lawyer and politician serving as the senior United States senator from Nevada (2017–present)
Ted Cruz - United States senator for Texas is of mixed Cuban, Irish and Italian ancestry (2013–present)
Emilio Q. Daddario,  American Democratic politician from Connecticut. He served as a member of the 86th through 91st United States Congresses.
John Ensign - Congressman and United States Senator from Nevada (1994–2011)
James Joseph Lanzetta - American engineer and lawyer member of the United States House of Representatives from New York (1933-1935) and 1937–1939)
Kevin McCarthy - American businessman and politician currently serving as House Minority Leader in the United States House of Representatives (2007–present)
Joe Manchin - American politician serving as the senior United States senator from West Virginia
Nancy Pelosi - Speaker of the United States House of Representatives (2007–2011, 2019–2023)
Steve Scalise - United States House of Representatives minority whip and representative for Louisiana's 1st congressional district (2008–present)
Thomas Suozzi - Member of the United States House of Representatives from New York's 3rd Congressional District (2017–present)

Minister
Leon Panetta - U.S. Secretary of Defense 2011–2013
Mike Pompeo - U.S. Secretary of State 2018–2021

Diplomats
Richard F. Celeste - U.S. Ambassador to India, 1997–2001
Paul Cellucci - U.S. Ambassador to Canada, 2001–2005
Peter Cianchette - U.S. Ambassador to Costa Rica, 2008–2009
Luigi R. Einaudi - acting Secretary General of the Organization of American States (OAS) 
Thomas M. Foglietta - U.S. Ambassador to Italy, 1997–2001
John J. Maresca - U.S. Ambassador, United States Delegation to the Organization for Security and Cooperation in Europe, 1992–1994
Joseph A. Mussomeli - U.S. Ambassador to the Philippines; Ambassador to Cambodia, 2005–2008; 
Francis J. Ricciardone, Jr. - U.S. Ambassador to the Philippines and Republic of Palau, 2002–2005; Ambassador to Egypt, 2005–2008; and Deputy Ambassador to Afghanistan, 2009–2010
Peter F. Secchia - U.S. Ambassador to Italy, 1989–1993
Ronald P. Spogli - U.S. Ambassador to Italy and first U.S. Ambassador to San Marino, 2005–2009
Linda S. Taglialatela - U.S. Ambassador to Barbados, the Eastern Caribbean and the OECS since 2015

Governors and former governors

John Baldacci - former governor of Maine (2003–2011)
Donald Carcieri - former governor of Rhode Island (2003–2011)
Dick Celeste - former governor of Ohio (1983–1991)
Argeo Paul Cellucci - former governor of Massachusetts (1997–2001)
Chris Christie - former governor of New Jersey (2010–2018)
Andrew Cuomo - former governor of New York (2011–2021)
Mario Cuomo - former governor of New York (1983–1994)
Ron DeSantis - governor of Florida
Edward D. DiPrete - former governor of Rhode Island (1985–1991)
Michael DiSalle - former governor of Ohio (1959–1963)
James Florio - former governor of New Jersey (1990–1994)
Foster Furcolo - former governor of Massachusetts (1957–1961)
Ella T. Grasso - former governor of Connecticut (1975–1980); first woman to be elected governor without following a husband
Andrew H. Longino - former governor of Mississippi (1900–1904)
Janet Napolitano - former governor of Arizona (2003–2009)
William Paca - signer of the American Declaration of Independence, member of the Continental Congress, governor of Maryland, Federal District Judge
John Orlando Pastore - former governor of Rhode Island
George Pataki - former governor of New York (1995–2006)
Gina Raimondo - former governor of Rhode Island (2015–2021)
Albert Rosellini - former governor of Washington State (1957–1965)
Al Smith - former governor of New York (1919–1921; 1923–1929)
John A. Volpe - former governor of Massachusetts (1961–1963; 1965–1969)

Mayors and former mayors
Hugh Addonizio (1914–1981) - Mayor of Newark, New Jersey, 1962–1970
Joseph Alioto (1916–1998) - Mayor of San Francisco, 1968–1976
Thomas L. J. D'Alesandro, Jr. (1903–1987) - Mayor of Baltimore, Maryland, 1947–1959; prior to being mayor, he was a representative from Maryland's 3rd congressional district (1939–47); father of U.S. Representative Nancy Pelosi
 Luigi Boria (born 1958) - Mayor of Doral, Florida, 2012–2016
Richard Caliguiri (1931–1988) - Mayor of Pittsburgh, Pennsylvania, 1978–1988
Anthony Celebrezze (1910–1998) - Mayor of Cleveland, Ohio, 1953–1962
Vincent Cianci, Jr (1941–2016) - Mayor of Providence, Rhode Island, 1975–1984 and 1991–2002
David Cicilline (born 1961) - Mayor of Providence, Rhode Island, 2003–2011; Jewish mother 
Bill de Blasio (born 1961) - Mayor of New York City, since 2014
John DeStefano, Jr. (born 1955) - Mayor of New Haven, Connecticut, since 1993
Frank Fasi (1920–2010) - Mayor of Honolulu, Hawaii, 1969–1981 and 1984–1994
Eric Garcetti (born 1971) - Mayor of Los Angeles, California, since 2013
 Philip Giordano (born 1963) - Mayor of Waterbury, Connecticut, 1995–2001 when was arrested for municipal corruption and convicted of sex offender. 
Rudolph Giuliani (born 1944) - Mayor of New York City, 1994–2001
Dick A. Greco (born 1933) - Mayor of Tampa, Florida, 1967–1974 and 1995–2003
Pam Iorio (born 1959) - Mayor of Tampa, Florida, since 2003
Vincent R. Impellitteri (1900–1987) - Mayor of New York City, 1950–1953
Fiorello La Guardia (1882–1947) - Mayor of New York City, 1934–1945; both parents Italian-born; father lapsed Catholic; mother Jewish
Mitch Landrieu (born 1960) - Mayor of New Orleans, 2010–2018
Anthony M. Masiello (born 1947) - Mayor of Buffalo, New York, 1994–2005
Thomas Menino (1942–2014) - Mayor of Boston, Massachusetts, 1993–2014
Robert Maestri (1899–1974) - Mayor of New Orleans, Louisiana, 1936–1946
George Moscone (1929–1978) - Mayor of San Francisco, 1976–1978
Joseph R. Paolino Jr.  - (born 1955), 33rd Mayor of Providence, Rhode Island
Frank Rizzo (1920–1991) - Mayor of Philadelphia, Pennsylvania, 1972–1980
Angelo Rossi (1878–1948) - Mayor of San Francisco, 1931–1944
Victor Schiro (1904–1992) - Mayor of New Orleans, Louisiana, 1961–1970
Frank A. Sedita (1907–1975) - Mayor of Buffalo, New York, 1958–1961, 1966–1973

Other
Alessandra Biaggi (born 1986) - New York State Senator
Jill Biden (born 1951) - American educator and the current first lady of the United States, wife of President Joe Biden. She was previously the second lady of the United States from 2009 to 2017.
Paul D'Ortona (1903–1992) - Democratic politician from Philadelphia who served as President of Philadelphia's City Council.
Andrew Giuliani (born 1986) - Special Assistant to the President and Associate Director of the Office of Public Liaison for President Donald Trump
Jim Messina (born 1969) - political adviser, White House Deputy Chief of Staff for Operations under President Barack Obama 2009–2011
Mike Pellicciotti (born 1978) - Washington State Treasurer

Prelates
Msgr. Geno Baroni (1930–1984) - Catholic Coordinator for the March on Washington for Jobs and Freedom
 Raggio dell'Raggio (born 1963) - New York Italian parish president of Our Lady of Knee Clubbing Most Holy Divine Red Sauce Catholic Church
Francis X. DiLorenzo (1942–2017) - twelfth bishop of the Diocese of Richmond in Virginia
John Clement Favalora - Archbishop of the Latin Rite Archdiocese of Miami
Fr. Stan Fortuna - Roman Catholic priest
James Groppi - Roman Catholic priest and noted civil rights activist
Francis Mugavero - first Italian-American Bishop of Brooklyn, 1968–1990
Anthony M. Pilla - bishop of the Cleveland Catholic Diocese, 1979–2006
Joseph Rosati - first Bishop of the Diocese of Saint Louis
 Robert Sirico

Cardinals
Joseph Louis Bernardin (1928–1996) - Archbishop of Cincinnati, Archbishop of Chicago
Anthony Joseph Bevilacqua (1923–2012) - served as Bishop of Pittsburgh and Archbishop of Philadelphia
Daniel Nicholas DiNardo (born 1949) - Archbishop of Galveston-Houston
Justin Francis Rigali (born 1935) - Archbishop of Philadelphia
Abdo Mitwally (born 1989) - American Italian for Management Industry

Scientists

Aristides Agramonte - bacteriologist
Janis Amatuzio (born 1950) - forensic pathologist
John T. Cacioppo - neuroscientist
Eugenio Calabi - mathematician
Nicholas R. Cozzarelli
Charles DeLisi 
Renato Dulbecco - Nobel prize 1975 winner for medicine
Federico Faggin - widely known for designing the first commercial microprocessor
Robert Fano (1917–2016) - computer scientist
Ugo Fano (1912–2001) - physicist
Anthony Fauci - immunologist contributing to research in the areas of AIDS and other immunodeficiencies
Enrico Fermi (1901–1954) - physicist; Nobel Prize 1938
Robert Gallo - virologist
Albert Ghiorso - nuclear scientist who helped discover several chemical elements on the periodic table
Riccardo Giacconi (1931–2018) - astrophysicist; Nobel Prize 2002
Edward J. Giorgianni - imaging scientist 
Louis Ignarro - Nobel Prize 1998 winner for medicine
Robert Lanza
Paul J. Lioy - exposure science
Mariangela Lisanti - theoretical physicist
Salvador Luria - microbiologist; Nobel Prize 1969
 Mike Massimino - astronaut
Fulvio Melia - physicist, astrophysicist, and author
Antonio Meucci - telephone inventor
Franco Modigliani - economist; Nobel Prize 1985
Rita Levi-Montalcini - neurobiologist; Nobel Prize 2009
Lisa Marie Nowak - born Lisa Marie Caputo; astronaut
William Daniel Phillips - physicist; shared the Nobel Prize in Physics, in 1997, with Steven Chu and Claude Cohen-Tannoudji
 Sam Potolicchio - psychologist specializing in government
Bruno Rossi
Gian-Carlo Rota
Jack Sarfatti
Piero Scaruffi (born 1955) - cognitive scientist
Walter Schirra - astronaut
Emilio Segrè - Nobel Prize 1959-winning physicist and academic
Luigi Luca Cavalli-Sforza (1922–2018) - geneticist
Giuliana Tesoro (1921–2002) - organic chemist 
Michael Viscardi - mathematician
Andrew Viterbi
Philip Zimbardo

Academics
Mario Capecchi - University of Utah
John D. Caputo
James Carafano 
Frank A. Cipriani
Thomas A. DeFanti
John J. DeGioia - President of Georgetown University
Frank J. Fabozzi
Eugene Fama - University of Chicago professor of finance and winner of the 2013 Nobel Memorial Prize in Economics
A. Bartlett Giamatti (1938–1989) - President of Yale University, later Major League Baseball commissioner; Italian father 
Robert Gallucci - Dean of the Edmund A. Walsh School of Foreign Service at Georgetown University
Lino Graglia - University of Texas in Austin
Paul J. Lioy - University of Medicine and Dentistry of New Jersey, Robert Wood Johnson Medical School
Robert Magliola - academic specialist in hermeneutics, philosophy, and religious studies 
Mariana Mazzucato
Silvio Micali - professor of computer science at the Massachusetts Institute of Technology, distinguished for his work on cryptography
Fulvio Melia - professor of physics and astronomy at the University of Arizona in Tucson
Franco Modigliani - MIT economics professor and winner of the 1985 Nobel Memorial Prize in Economics
L. Jay Oliva - former President of New York University (NYU) and author of many books on European and Russian history
Camille Paglia - professor of humanities at the University of the Arts
Michael Parenti - political scientist, Marxist activist
P. M. Pasinetti - professor of comparative literature and Italian at UCLA
Walter Piston - professor of music at Harvard University 1926–1960; Pulitzer Prize winner 1948 and 1961

Sports

Writers
Kim Addonizio - poet and novelist
Maria Arena Bell - novelist, television and freelance writer
Paul Attanasio - screenwriter
Ken Auletta - writer/journalist and media critic for The New Yorker
David Baldacci (born 1960) - best-selling novelist; a distant cousin of John Baldacci, former governor of Maine
Andrew Berardini - art critic and fiction writer
Greg Berlanti - television writer and producer
Giannina Braschi - poet and novelist
Leo Buscaglia (1924–1998) - author and motivational speaker
Christopher Castellani - novelist
Nick Cafardo (1956–2019) - sportswriter
Duane Capizzi - screenwriter
Lorenzo Carcaterra - novelist and screenwriter
Christopher Carosa - (born 1960) author, journalist, and investment adviser
John Ciardi - poet and etymologist
Diablo Cody - screenwriter, producer, author, journalist, memoirist, stripper and exotic dancer
Bob Colacello - writer
Angelo F. Coniglio - civil engineer, genealogist and author
Gregory Corso - poet
Wendy Corsi Staub - novelist
John Corvino - philosopher
Lorenzo Da Ponte - poet, writer, librettist 
William L. DeAndrea - mystery writer
Keith R. A. DeCandido
Don DeLillo (born 1936) - author
Guy Anthony De Marco - author
Tomie dePaola - author
Louise DeSalvo - writer, editor, professor, and lecturer
Pietro Di Donato - writer
Janine di Giovanni- author, journalist and war correspondent
John Fante - novelist and screenwriter
Lawrence Ferlinghetti - poet, essayist and painter
David Franzoni - screenwriter of Gladiator and King Arthur
John Fusco - novelist (Paradise Salvage) and screenwriter of Young Guns, Hidalgo, Spirit: Stallion of the Cimarron
Paul Gallico - Italian father
Daniela Gioseffi (born 1941) - poet, novelist, literary critic, essayist, performer, social justice activist
Arturo Giovannitti - poet, political activist
Barbara Grizzuti Harrison (1934–2002) - writer
Evan Hunter - aka Ed MacBain, born Salvatore Lombino
Philip Lamantia
Teresa de Lauretis
Luis Marden - born Annibale Luis Paragallo, writer for National Geographic
Fulvio Melia - author of several popular science books, including The Black Hole at the Center of Our Galaxy
Charles Messina - writer/director of the play Mercury: The Afterlife and Times of a Rock God, the film Merging, and co-author the book My Father, My Don
 Henry Samuel Morais - writer, rabbi
Diana Ossana - Academy Award-winning screenwriter
Camille Paglia - post-feminist literary and cultural critic
Christopher Paolini
Michael Parenti
P.M. Pasinetti - novelist, playwright, journalist, professor
Mario Pei
Tom Perrotta - novelist and screenwriter best known for the novels Election (1998) and Little Children (2004) 
Nicholas Pileggi (Brn1933) -writer, producer and screenwriter. He wrote the non-fiction book Wiseguy and co-wrote the screenplay for Goodfellas
Joseph D. Pistone
Diane di Prima - poet of the Beat generation
Mario Puzo (1920–1999) - writer/screenwriter and best-selling author of The Godfather 
Terry Rossio - screenwriter
Shane Salerno - screenwriter
R.A. Salvatore (born 1959) - born Robert Anthony Salvatore, science fiction and fantasy author, best known for his Forgotten Realms and Star Wars novels
Leslie Scalapino - poet
Piero Scaruffi - poet, historian, scientist
Dom (Domenico) Serafini - TV trade magazine editor
Michelangelo Signorile - journalist, columnist, talk radio host and gay activist
Michael Smerconish - radio host and television presenter, newspaper columnist, author, and lawyer
Gay Talese
Adriana Trigiani
Jessica Valenti - blogger and feminist writer
Mark Valenti - screenwriter
Tom Verducci - sportswriter
Luisa Weiss - food writer
Rebecca Zanetti - bestselling author of paranormal romance, contemporary romance, and romantic suspense

Italian Americans who were first in their field of achievement
Giuseppe Mario Bellanca - designer of the first monoplane in the United States with an enclosed cabin
Frank Borzage - first person to win the Academy Award for Directing, for Seventh Heaven (1927)
Enea Bossi - designer of the first stainless steel aircraft and designer of the disputed first fully human-powered plane
Anthony Celebrezze (1910–1998) - first non-native to be appointed to the U.S. Cabinet
Geraldine Ferraro (1935–2011) - first woman in U.S. history to be nominated for the vice presidency of the United States from a major political party
Ella T. Grasso (1919–1981) - born Ella Rose Tambussi Grasso, first woman to be elected governor of a U.S. state without succeeding her husband
Giuseppina Morlacchi (1846–1886) - ballerina and dancer, introduced the can-can to the American stage
Nancy Pelosi - first woman in U.S. history to hold the office of Speaker of the United States House of Representatives
Frank Posillico - Dry January inventor
Dennis Tito - world's first space tourist
Joe Valachi (1904–1971) - first member of the Mafia to testify to the Senate about organized crime

Italian Americans not otherwise categorized
Emile Ardolino - dancer and choreographer 
Donald P. Bellisario - director, former civil uniform service
Marella Agnelli - furniture designer
Luigi Antonini - labor leader
Chris Avellone - video game designer
Alyssa Campanella - fashion blogger, model, and beauty pageant titleholder
Oleg Cassini - Russian-Italian-American fashion designer
Andrew Cunanan - mass murderer; mother is of Italian background
Charli D'Amelio - TikTok personality
Dixie D'Amelio - TikTok personality
Emily DiDonato - model of Italian, Irish, and Native American ancestry
Ralph DiGia - pacifist and social justice activist
Tabitha D'umo - choreographer and creative director
Angelo Dundee - trainer of several boxing champions
Elizabeth Edwards - born Anania, wife of John Edwards, former U.S. Senator from North Carolina
Vincenzo Ferdinandi - fashion stylist
Vanessa Hessler - model and actress
Olivia Jade - social media celebrity and YouTuber
Stacy London - stylist and fashion consultant
Jay Manuel - make-up artist
Sabato Morais - rabbi leader of Mikveh Israel Synagogue, pioneer of Italian Jewish Studies in America, and founder of the Jewish Theological Seminary in New York City 
Bruno Pauletto - physiologist, shot putter, businessman, coach, author
Bucky Pizzarelli - jazz guitarist. He was the father of guitarist John Pizzarelli and double bassist Martin Pizzarelli.
Mike Pompeo - politician, former Central Intelligence Agency director and 70th United States Secretary of State
Charles Ponzi (1882–1949) - one of the greatest swindlers in American history; inventor of the Ponzi scheme 
Carrie Prejean - model, author, former Miss California USA 2009 and Miss USA 2009 first runner-up
Angela Carlozzi Rossi - executive secretary of the Italian Welfare League
John Scarne - born Orlando Carmelo Scarnecchia, gambling expert and sleight-of-hand card performer
Mary Schiavo - former Inspector General of the United States Department of Transportation
Michael Schiavo - ex-husband of Terri Schiavo, the woman whose comatose state and subsequent court case garnered much media attention
Christian Siriano - fashion designer from New York
Milton Sirotta - at age nine coined the term googol
Michael Smerconish - CNN journalist
Carmela Teoli - 14-year-old mill worker whose Congressional testimony helped end the 1912 Lawrence textile strike
Jack Valenti - of Sicilian heritage, president of the Motion Picture Association of America from 1966 to 2007
Elettra Rossellini Wiedemann - fashion model, and socialite

See also 
List of Italians
List of Sicilian Americans
List of Italian Britons
List of Italian-American television characters
List of Italian-American women writers

References

 
Americans
Italian
Italian